Andrea Janakas is an American writer and director from Boston, Massachusetts.

Andrea's projects have garnered acclaim from festivals and notable mentors such as Rodrigo Garcia, Gill Dennis and Graeme Clifford. A recipient of an American Film Institute scholarship, she was awarded a Fuji Filmmaker Award for her film, Gypsies, Tramps & Thieves. The film premiered at the Los Angeles Film Festival and stars Amanda Seyfried and Annie Quinn.

Her television work includes co-writing the romantic comedy Holly's Holiday for Lifetime.

She was a 2015 finalist for Nantucket Film Festival's Showtime's Tony Cox Episodic Screenplay (60 min) Competition.

References

Sources
http://www.salemnews.com/local/x520558204/Peabody-filmmaker-in-L-A-looks-forward-to-holiday-at-home salemnews.com
https://tribecafilminstitute.org/filmmakers/detail/andrea_janakas tribecafilminstitute.org
http://www.outfest.org/outfest-announces-2014-screenwriting-lab-fellows/ outfest.org

External links 
 

Year of birth missing (living people)
Living people
American film directors
Writers from Boston